The canton of La Motte-du-Caire is a former administrative division in southeastern France. It was disbanded following the French canton reorganisation which came into effect in March 2015. It consisted of 13 communes, which joined the canton of Seyne in 2015. It had 2,563 inhabitants (2012).

The canton comprised the following communes:

Le Caire
Châteaufort
Clamensane
Claret
Curbans
Melve
La Motte-du-Caire
Nibles
Sigoyer
Thèze
Valavoire
Valernes
Vaumeilh

Demographics

See also
Cantons of the Alpes-de-Haute-Provence department

References

Former cantons of Alpes-de-Haute-Provence
2015 disestablishments in France
States and territories disestablished in 2015